The  (abbreviation: ₶.) was one of numerous currencies used in medieval France, and a unit of account (i.e., a monetary unit used in accounting) used in Early Modern France.

The  was a gold coin of one  minted in large numbers from 1360.
It was the basis of the revolutionary French franc of 1795, defined as 4.5 grams of fine silver exactly.

Circulating currency

The latter were initially minted by the abbey of Saint Martin in the Touraine region of France.

The  was, in common with the original livre of Charlemagne, divided into 20  ( after 1715), each of which was divided into 12 deniers.

Other francs were minted under Charles V, Henry III and Henry IV.

Accounting currency
With many forms of domestic and international money (with different weights, purities and quality) circulating throughout Europe in the late Middle Ages and the early modern period, the use of an accounting currency became a financial necessity. In the world of international banking of the 13th century, it was the florin and ducat that were often used.

The official use of the  accounting unit in all contracts in France was legislated in 1549, but it had been one of the standard units of accounting in France since the 13th century.  In 1577 the  accounting unit was officially abolished and accountants switched to the écu, which was at that time the major French gold coin in actual circulation, but in 1602 the  accounting unit was brought back.  (A monetary unit of accounting based on the  continued to be used for minor uses in and around Paris and was not officially abolished until 1667 by Louis XIV).

Since coins in Europe in the Middle Ages and the Early modern period (the French écu, Louis, teston d'argent, denier, double, franc; the Spanish doubloon, pistole, real; the Italian florin, ducat or sequin; the German and Austrian thaler; the Dutch gulden, etc.) did not have any indication of their value, their official value was determined by royal edicts. In cases of financial need, French kings could use the official value for currency devaluation. By reversing these techniques, currencies could be reinforced.

For example: 
 the worth of an écu d'or, a French gold coin, was changed from 60 to 57 sols in 1573.
 to curb increasing use of the Spanish real, its official worth was decreased to 4 sols 2 deniers in the 1570s.

Royal finance officers faced many difficulties.  In addition to currency speculation, forgery and the intentional shaving of precious metal from coins (which was harshly punished), they had the difficult problem of setting values for gold, silver, copper and billon coins, responding to the often large influx of foreign coin and the appearance of inferior foreign coins of intentionally similar design.  For more on these issues, see Monetary policy and Gresham's Law.

Unicode symbol

See also
French franc#History
Louis (coin)
Luxembourgish livre
Écu (coin)
Roman currency

Coins of France
Economic history of the Ancien Régime